Monifieth High School, a comprehensive state high school in Monifieth, Angus, Scotland, was founded in 1976. It was opened by Lord Thomson of Monifieth. The school enrolls approximately 1100 pupils from a catchment area including Monifieth, parts of Barnhill, Birkhill and other rural areas of Angus including the Hillbanks area, Liff and Auchterhouse.

School performance
Monifieth High School has very good exam results in all areas of the school, achieving more than double the average for the number of pupils attaining five or more awards at Higher in 2010.

As of 2021, the school was last inspected by Education Scotland in 2015, when inspectors found that "Young people learn and achieve well at Monifieth High School ... [although] the pace of learning could be brisker, activities more challenging and young people could be given more responsibility for their learning".

Facilities
In 2004, the school renovated many of its facilities, including the reception area, and constructed new changing rooms, increased singing rooms in the music department, and installed many interactive whiteboards in classrooms.

In 2010 pupils vandalised school buildings.

As of 2020, the school is over-subscribed and the school buildings are reported to be "struggling to cope".

Community support

In 2020, the school was one of eight local schools making and supplying masks to health workers.

Previous rectors and headteachers

As of 2022, the headteacher is Andy Dingwall. The previous headteacher was M-C McInally (from 2013). Before that, the school's rectors were Hector Low (to 1994), Jim Collins (1994 to 2000) and Richard Coton (2000 to 2013).

Notable staff
Rhona Goss won the "Teachers of Physics" award in 2005 from the Institute of Physics.

Notable former pupils

 Tom Simpson – keyboard player for Snow Patrol
 Paul Dixon – former Dundee United and Scotland player

References

External links

 Monifieth High Online
Monifieth High's page on Scottish Schools Online
 Satellite Image of School
 Examination Results in Scottish Schools 1996-1998
 Examination Results in Scottish Schools 1999-2001

Secondary schools in Angus, Scotland
1976 establishments in Scotland
Educational institutions established in 1976